Qarğalıq (also, Kargalyk and Il’kychy-Gasanefendi) is a village in the Khachmaz Rayon of Azerbaijan.  The village forms part of the municipality of İlxıçı.

References 

Populated places in Khachmaz District